Jean-Pierre Tempet (born 31 December 1954) is a French former football goalkeeper.

References
 Profile
 Profile, stats, photos

1954 births
Living people
French footballers
France international footballers
Association football goalkeepers
RC Lens players
Stade Lavallois players
FC Mulhouse players
Valenciennes FC players
Ligue 1 players